The redfin bully (Gobiomorphus huttoni) is a species of freshwater fish in the family Eleotridae endemic to New Zealand. Being amphidromous, it spends part of its life cycle at sea. Males have distinctive bright red patterns and stripes on their fins.

Description
Male redfin bullies are the most colourful freshwater fish in New Zealand, with bright red markings on the dorsal, anal, and tail fins, as well as the body and cheeks. Additionally, males have a bluish-green stripe on the outer edge of the first dorsal fin. Only the males have the red colouring; the females have the same patterns, but with brown in place of red. Redfin bullies of both sexes have distinctive diagonal stripes on their cheeks. These stripes are very useful for positive identification, as they are visible in small (about 30 mm long) and very pale fish. G. huttoni reaches a length of 120 mm. Males are larger than females.

Distribution and habitat
G. huttoni is endemic to New Zealand, found throughout both main islands as well as Stewart Island and the Chatham Islands. Redfins are quite rare along the east coast of the South Island north of Oamaru, except for Banks Peninsula. They are very good climbers, able to traverse waterfalls when going upstream, and prefer to live near the coast; they do not establish landlocked populations.

Redfins mainly live in the runs and pools of small, boulder-filled streams, and prefer a habitat with a moderate flow of water with pools and riffles, in quite large gravelly streams with cobble substrates. They do not need a dense overhead canopy, but prefer a high proportion of native trees.

Life cycle
Redfin bullies are amphidromous – they migrate between fresh water and the sea as part of their life cycle.

Over winter and spring, the male establishes and defends a ‘nest’ – usually a hollow beneath a rock. The male turns very dark, from brown to completely black, while defending the nest. When a female is ready to lay eggs, she enters the nest and turns upside-down to lay 1,000–20,000 oval eggs in a close-packed, single layer attached to the nest's ‘ceiling’. The male then fertilises the eggs. The female leaves the eggs in the care of the male, which guards them until they hatch two to four weeks later. Females may lay more than once over the spawning season, and one male may defend the eggs of more than one female.

Upon hatching, the 3 mm fry are carried downstream to the sea; several months later, they return as 15–20 mm juveniles, and live the rest of their lives in fresh water. Redfin bullies seem obliged to spend their first few months at sea, because no landlocked populations have been found. Juveniles have the best climbing ability of the Gobiomorphus species, but are mostly found in lowland waterways. They reach sexual maturity in their second year and have an average lifespan around 3–4 years.

Diet and foraging
G. huttoni is an opportunistic feeder, eating the larvae of chironomid midges, mayflies, and caddisflies, small crustaceans, and aquatic snails.

Threats
The main threats to G. huttoni are competition and predation from introduced salmonid fishes, mainly brown trout (Salmo trutta), and habitat loss. Over the period of 2004 - 2014, redfin bully numbers declined by 20%, and they are now classified as a near-threatened species.

References

External links
 Photograph of male
 Photograph of female

Eleotridae

Taxa named by James Douglas Ogilby
Endemic freshwater fish of New Zealand
Fish described in 1894